Wayne Luis Tribue (born April 30, 1990) is an American football guard who is currently a free agent. He played college football at Temple. He was signed as an undrafted free agent by the Denver Broncos in 2012.

Professional career

Denver Broncos
Tribue signed with the Denver Broncos as an undrafted free agent following the 2012 NFL Draft.

New Orleans Saints
Tribue was signed by the Saints on December 17, 2012.

San Francisco 49ers
Tribue signed with the San Francisco 49ers on January 23, 2013. He was released by the 49ers on August 31, 2013.

Portland Thunder
On December 20, 2013, Tribue was selected by the Portland Thunder during the 2014 AFL Expansion Draft.

Philadelphia Soul
On February 20, 2014, Tribue was traded to the Philadelphia Soul for future considerations.

Dallas Cowboys
After finished the season with the Soul, Tribue signed with the Dallas Cowboys of the National Football League. The Cowboys waived Tribue on August 26, 2014.

Jacksonville Sharks
On November 24, 2014, Tribue was assigned to the Jacksonville Sharks.

Philadelphia Soul
On December 3, 2015, Tribue was assigned to the Soul once again. On August 26, 2016, the Soul beat the Arizona Rattlers in ArenaBowl XXIX by a score of 56–42. He earned AFL Offensive Lineman of the Year and First Team All-Arena honors in 2017. On August 26, 2017, the Soul beat the Tampa Bay Storm in ArenaBowl XXX by a score of 44–40.

Beijing Lions
Tribue was selected by the Beijing Lions of the China Arena Football League (CAFL) in the first round of the 2016 CAFL Draft. He earned All-Pro North Division All-Star honors in 2016. He is listed on the Lions' roster for the 2018 season.

References

External links
 Temple Owls bio

1990 births
Living people
Players of American football from Philadelphia
American football offensive guards
Temple Owls football players
Denver Broncos players
San Jose SaberCats players
Portland Thunder players
Philadelphia Soul players
Jacksonville Sharks players
Beijing Lions players